Minerva is a reimplementation of Sinclair QDOS, the built-in operating system of the Sinclair QL line of personal computers. Written by Laurence Reeves in England, Minerva incorporates many bug fixes and enhancements to both QDOS and the SuperBASIC programming language. Later versions also provide the ability to multi-task several instances of the SuperBASIC interpreter, something not supported by QDOS.

Minerva was distributed as a ROM chip on a daughterboard which replaces the QL's original ROM chips. A Minerva Mk. II daughterboard also incorporates an I²C interface and non-volatile real-time clock. As of version 1.89, the Minerva source code is licensed under the GNU General Public License.

Other reimplementations of QDOS include SMS2 and SMSQ/E.

External links 

 Laurence Reeves' page, includes complete Minerva source code
 TF Services Minerva page

Discontinued operating systems
Free software operating systems
Sinclair Research